Gabriel Arias may refer to:

 Gabriel Arias (footballer) (born 1987), Chilean soccer player
 Gabriel Arias (pitcher) (born 1989), Dominican Republic baseball pitcher
 Gabriel Arias (shortstop) (born 2000), Venezuelan baseball shortstop